Christopher James Stroud (born February 3, 1982) is an American professional golfer who currently plays on the PGA Tour. He finally got his first professional win on August 6, 2017 at the Barracuda Championship after 290 starts on the PGA Tour.

Early career
Stroud was born in Groves, Texas. He played college golf at Lamar University and was a two-time All-American. As an amateur, he won the 2003 North and South Amateur and played on the 2004 Palmer Cup team.

Professional career
Stroud turned pro in 2004. He played on mini-tours until earning his PGA Tour card at the 2006 (T16), 2007 (3rd), and 2008 (T4) Qualifying schools. He was not able to finish high enough on the money list to retain his card until 2009 when he finished 113th. His best performance in a PGA Tour event during these early years was a tie for fifth at the 2007 Zurich Classic of New Orleans. In 2013, he lost to Ken Duke in a playoff at the Travelers Championship.

On August 6, 2017, Stroud earned his first PGA Tour victory when he won the Barracuda Championship in a playoff over Greg Owen and Richy Werenski. It was his 290th PGA Tour start and he was playing on conditional status. At the 2017 PGA Championship, Stroud was near the top for the first three rounds before a final round 76 earned him a T9 finish. Prior to his win, Stroud was planning on retiring after the season.

Amateur wins (1)
2003 North and South Amateur

Professional wins (1)

PGA Tour wins (1)

PGA Tour playoff record (1–1)

Results in major championships

CUT = missed the half-way cut
"T" = tied for place

Summary

Most consecutive cuts made – 3 (2014 PGA – 2018 PGA, current)
Longest streak of top-10s – 1

Results in The Players Championship

CUT = missed the halfway cut
WD = withdrew
"T" indicates a tie for a place

U.S. national team appearances
Amateur
Palmer Cup: 2004

See also
2006 PGA Tour Qualifying School graduates
2007 PGA Tour Qualifying School graduates
2008 PGA Tour Qualifying School graduates

References

External links

American male golfers
Lamar Cardinals golfers
PGA Tour golfers
Golfers from Houston
People from Jefferson County, Texas
1982 births
Living people